Enrique Daniel Uberti Garcia (born 11 August 1963) is a Uruguayan former football player and manager.

External links

References

1963 births
Living people
Uruguayan footballers
Uruguay under-20 international footballers
Uruguayan expatriate footballers
Danubio F.C. players
A.D. Isidro Metapán footballers
Real C.D. España players
Comunicaciones F.C. players
C.D. Atlético Marte footballers
C.D. FAS footballers
C.D. Luis Ángel Firpo footballers
Uruguayan football managers
Expatriate footballers in El Salvador
Expatriate footballers in Honduras
Expatriate footballers in Guatemala
Expatriate football managers in El Salvador
Expatriate football managers in Honduras
Real C.D. España managers
Liga Nacional de Fútbol Profesional de Honduras players
Association football defenders